Josien Ten Thije-Voortman (born  24 December 1969 Haaksbergen) is a Dutch Paralympic sitting volleyball player. She is part of the Netherlands women's national sitting volleyball team.

She competed at the  2004 Summer Paralympics, 2008 Summer Paralympics finishing third, and at the 2012 Summer Paralympics, finishing 4th, after losing from Ukraine in the bronze medal match.

See also 
Netherlands at the 2012 Summer Paralympics

References

External links
 paralympish profile

1959 births
Living people
Dutch amputees
Dutch sitting volleyball players
Dutch sportswomen
Medalists at the 2008 Summer Paralympics
Paralympic volleyball players of the Netherlands
Volleyball players at the 2004 Summer Paralympics
Volleyball players at the 2008 Summer Paralympics
Volleyball players at the 2012 Summer Paralympics
Women's sitting volleyball players
People from Diemen
Medalists at the 2004 Summer Paralympics
Paralympic medalists in volleyball
Paralympic silver medalists for the Netherlands
Paralympic bronze medalists for the Netherlands
Sportspeople from North Holland